Aleksandr Cherkasov (born February 5, 1956) is a former Soviet sport shooter. He competed in skeet shooting events at the Summer Olympics in 1976, 1988, and 1992.

Olympic results

References

1956 births
Living people
Skeet shooters
Soviet male sport shooters
Shooters at the 1976 Summer Olympics
Shooters at the 1988 Summer Olympics
Shooters at the 1992 Summer Olympics
Olympic shooters of the Soviet Union
Olympic shooters of the Unified Team